Silene supina is a species of flowering plant in the family Caryophyllaceae.

Occurrence 
The species grows on stony slopes and sand.

The species is native to Europe. The species can be found in Albania, Greece, Croatia, Slovenia, Serbia, North Macedonia, Republic of Bosnia and Herzegovina, Montenegro and in the North Caucasus.

Subspecies 
Subspecies of this species include:

 Silene spergulifolia subsp. soskae
 Silene spergulifolia subsp. spergulifolia

References 

supina